JAJ may refer to:
 Jaj, a village in Lebanon
 Jhajha railway station, in Bihar, India
 Zazao language
 James Austin Johnson, American comedian and actor

See also 
 J & J (disambiguation)